The second season of The New Adventures of Old Christine premiered on CBS on Monday nights from 9:30/8:30/8:00 pm from September 18, 2006 and concluded on May 7, 2007. It consisted of 22 episodes.

In this season, due to Richard and Christine's brief kiss, Richie believes that his parents have gotten back together much to his parents' dismay. Christine starts dating an older man who she later discovers is New Christine's father, this situation causes Richard and New Christine to rekindle their romance once again. Barb decides to start working at the gym with Christine, while Christine falls hard for Richie's new teacher, Mr. Harris. The season finale included Richard sleeping with Christine after breaking up with New Christine yet again. This causes a pregnancy scare for Christine which is soon avoided. Eventually, New Christine takes Richard back and Mr. Harris takes a new teaching job at another school to be with Christine.

Cast and characters

Main
 Julia Louis-Dreyfus as "Old" Christine Campbell
 Clark Gregg as Richard Campbell
 Hamish Linklater as Matthew Kimble
 Trevor Gagnon as Ritchie Campbell
 Emily Rutherfurd as "New" Christine Hunter
 Tricia O'Kelley and Alex Kapp Horner as Marly and Lindsay (a.k.a. "The Meanie Moms")

Recurring
 Wanda Sykes as Barbara 'Barb' Baran
 Blair Underwood as Daniel Harris
 Lily Goff as Ashley Ehrhardt
 Marissa Blanchard as Kelsey

Guest stars
 Scott Bakula as 'Papa' Jeff Hunter
 Nancy Lenehan as Mrs. Marcie Nunley
 Ed Begley, Jr. as Pastor Ed
 Mary Gross as Mrs. Orr
 Andy Richter as Stan
 Mary Beth McDonough as Mrs. Wilhoite
 Amy Farrington as Ali
 Don Lake as Carl
 Matt Letscher as Burton Shaffer
 Tim Bagley as Dr. Mike
 Charles Esten as Joe Campbell
 Sandra Bernhard as Audrey
 Patrick Breen as Edmund
 Jane Lynch as Coach Hammond
 Dave Foley as Tom
 Matthew Glave as Ben
 Rachael Harris as Claire

Episodes

Ratings

References

2006 American television seasons
2007 American television seasons